Linton Chorley Hope FRAes (18 April 1863 – 20 December 1920) was a sailor from Great Britain, who represented his country at the 1900 Summer Olympics in Meulan, France. With Lorne Currie as helmsman and fellow crewmembers John Gretton and Algernon Maudslay, Hope took first places in both the race of the .5 to 1 ton class and the Open class.

Personal life
Hope was born in Macclesfield, Cheshire on 18 April 1863 as Linton Chorley Hopps the son of Edwin and Sara Hopps. He later changed his surname to Hope. Hope married Mabel Ellington in 1898 and they had a son and a daughter, their son Eustace Jack Linton Hope was killed in action in 1941 as a group captain in the Royal Air Force. Hope died on 20 December 1920 in the Midhurst district of Sussex.

Professional life
Hope designed a variety of yachts, as well as the Fairy One Design for the North of Ireland Yacht Club, international canoes, Thames Raters, and Half Raters that were sent to India, specifically the Malabar, Nainital and Rangoon Yacht Clubs. Both Olympic races were won using the yacht Scotia designed by Hope. He was appointed naval architect to the King of the Belgians.

In 1915 Hope designed the AD Flying Boat for the British Admiralty's Air Department and his hull designs were used by a number of British flying boats in the 1920s including the Phoenix P.5 Cork and Fairey Titania, largest flying boat in the world at the time.

Further reading

References

External links

1863 births
1920 deaths
Sportspeople from Macclesfield
British male sailors (sport)
British yacht designers
English designers
English Olympic medallists
Olympic gold medallists for Great Britain
Fellows of the Royal Aeronautical Society
Sailors at the 1900 Summer Olympics – .5 to 1 ton
Sailors at the 1900 Summer Olympics – Open class
Olympic sailors of Great Britain
Medalists at the 1900 Summer Olympics
Olympic medalists in sailing
Royal Air Force group captains